Amir Omrani (born 8 February 1989) is a Tunisian football player, currently playing for the Tunisia national team.

Career
On 17 June 2022, Omrani joined Saudi Arabian club Al-Zulfi. On 7 January 2023, he was released by the club.

International career
Omrani was called up to the Tunisia national team in 2015 and came on as a 90th-minute substitute for Taha Yassine Khenissi in a 1-1 draw with China.

Career statistics

Club

Notes

International

References

External links
 

1989 births
Living people
Tunisian footballers
Tunisia international footballers
Association football wingers
EGS Gafsa players
Étoile Sportive du Sahel players
People from Gafsa Governorate
AS Gabès players
AS Marsa players
Al-Sadd FC (Saudi football club) players
Al-Thoqbah Club players
Al-Arabi SC (Saudi Arabia) players
Al-Zulfi FC players
Saudi First Division League players
Saudi Second Division players
Tunisian expatriate sportspeople in Saudi Arabia
Expatriate footballers in Saudi Arabia